Lina Mathilde Manninen (née von Osten, formerly Heydrich; 14 June 1911 – 14 August 1985) was the wife of Reinhard Heydrich, head of the Reich Security Main Office and a central figure in Nazi Germany. The daughter of a minor German aristocrat (he worked as a village schoolteacher), she joined the Nazi Party in 1929 and met Reinhard Heydrich in December 1930. The two wed on 26 December 1931 and had four children. After World War II ended, she published a memoir in 1976. She spoke with several authors, wrote letters of correction to many newspapers, and defended the reputation of her first husband (Heydrich) until her death at age 74 in August 1985 in Fehmarn.

Nazi Party membership
Lina's older brother Hans had joined the Nazi Party and was a member of the Sturmabteilung (SA). He spoke highly of the movement to Lina and she attended a Party rally in 1929 where Adolf Hitler spoke. Shortly thereafter, Lina von Osten joined the Nazi Party with party membership number 1,201,380.

On 6 December 1930, aged 19, she attended a rowing-club ball in Kiel and met then Naval Lieutenant Heydrich there. They became romantically involved and soon announced their engagement on 18 December 1930.

In 1931, he was charged with "conduct unbecoming to an officer and gentleman" for breaking an engagement promise to a woman he had known for six months before the engagement to Lina. Admiral Erich Raeder dismissed Heydrich from the navy that April. The dismissal devastated Heydrich, who found himself without career prospects.

Lina persuaded Heydrich to look into the recently formed Schutzstaffel (SS) as a career option. During 1931, SS Leader Heinrich Himmler began setting up a counterintelligence division of the SS. Acting on the advice of his associate Karl von Eberstein, a friend of the Heydrich family, Himmler agreed to interview Heydrich, but cancelled their appointment at the last minute. Lina ignored this message, packed Reinhard's suitcase, and sent him to Munich.

Eberstein met Heydrich at the train station and took him to see Himmler. Himmler asked Heydrich to convey his ideas for developing an SS intelligence service. Himmler was so impressed that he hired Heydrich immediately as the chief of the new SS 'Ic Service' or Intelligence Service (which later became known as the Sicherheitsdienst (SD)). He returned to Hamburg with the good news. Heydrich entered into the Hamburg SS on 14 July. In August, he was transferred to Munich where he lived alone in a boarding house which rented rooms to unmarried SS men. Lina later stated that Reinhard Heydrich never read Hitler's book, Mein Kampf. He and Lina wed at a small church in Großenbrode on 26 December 1931.

Family
Lina Heydrich gave birth to two sons, Klaus (born 17 June 1933) and Heider (born 23 December 1934). By the late 1930s, the duties of Reinhard Heydrich led him to work long hours and often be away from home. This left Lina at home with the children and having to run the household alone. This placed a serious strain on their marriage that nearly resulted in divorce. However, the reconciled Heydrich couple had another child, a daughter named Silke (born 9 April 1939). Reinhard proudly showed off his baby daughter and they had a close relationship.

Their fourth child, a daughter named Marte (born 23 July 1942) was born shortly after Reinhard Heydrich's death. Klaus died as a result of a traffic accident on 24 October 1943. On that day, Klaus was cycling with his brother Heider Heydrich in the courtyard of the Castle Panenské Břežany (Jungfern-Breschan). Seeing that the gate to the street was open, Klaus rode out onto the street where he was struck by a small truck coming down the road. Klaus died from his injuries later that afternoon and his body was buried in the garden of the estate. Lina wanted to have the driver and all passengers shot, but the investigation found the driver not guilty.

In recognition of her husband's service to the Nazi cause, Hitler gave to Lina the country estate of Jungfern-Breschan in rural Bohemia. Lina sold the other family properties, including the home in Berlin and the hunting lodge near Nauen. She kept several dozen prisoners at the estate for forced labour. The family lived there until April 1945 when they, along with many other Germans left the area to flee the advancing Soviet Red Army. The family made it to Bavaria and then moved back to the island of Fehmarn where they were allowed to live in their house after the British Army moved out that same year.

Post-war
Lina Heydrich was cleared during the de-Nazification proceedings after the war's end. She further won the right to receive a pension as the result of a series of court cases against the West German government in 1956 and 1959. She was entitled to a substantial pension because her husband was a German Police general killed in action. The government had previously declined to pay because of Heydrich's role in the Holocaust. In Czechoslovakia, she was tried in absentia and sentenced to life imprisonment, which she evaded.

In 1965, she met Finnish theatre director Mauno Manninen while she was on a holiday trip to Finland. Eventually, they married for the purpose of changing her last name. She ran Reinhard Heydrich's former summer house on Fehmarn as a restaurant and inn until it burned down in February 1969, during welding work within the roofspace that caught the thatched roof alight. Manninen died in September 1969.

In 1976, she published a memoir, Leben mit einem Kriegsverbrecher (Life with a War Criminal). She spoke with several authors, sent in letters of correction to many newspapers, and defended the reputation of her first husband until her own death at the age of 74 on 14 August 1985 in Fehmarn.

Works
  Reissued with amendments to LH's original text, without the historical commentary included in the first edition, and with an introduction by son Heider Heydrich, under the title

References

Sources

Further reading
 Heydrich, Lina (1976). Leben mit einem Kriegsverbrecher ("Life with a War Criminal"), Ludwig Verlag, Pfaffenhofen; .

1911 births
1985 deaths
People from Fehmarn
Nazi Party members
Lina
Women in Nazi Germany